White Music is the 1978 debut album by XTC.

White Music may also refer to:
White Music (Crack the Sky album)
White Music (SCH album)
White Music, a Thai record label